William Kennedy may refer to:

Politics and law
 William Kennedy (North Carolina politician) (1768–1834), U.S. Congressman from North Carolina
 William Kennedy (New Jersey politician) (1775–1826), American politician, acting governor of New Jersey
 William Kennedy (Montana politician) (1835–1904), miner, restaurant and hotel proprietor, 8th mayor of Missoula, Montana
 William Kennedy (Wisconsin politician) (1841–1910), American lawyer and legislator
 William Kennedy (Connecticut politician) (1854–1918), United States congressman from Connecticut
 William Nassau Kennedy (1839–1885), Manitoba politician, mayor of Winnipeg
 William James Kennedy (politician) (1857–1912), Manitoba politician
 William Walker Kennedy (1882–1963), Manitoba politician and lawyer
 William Farris Kennedy (1888–1951), British Columbia politician
 William Costello Kennedy (1868–1923), Canadian businessman and politician
 William Rann Kennedy (1846–1915), British jurist and Lord Justice of Appeal, classical scholar
 William Francis Kennedy (died 1874), member of the Queensland Legislative Assembly
 William H. Kennedy III (active since 1993), American lawyer and associate counsel to president Clinton

Arts and entertainment 
 William Kennedy (author) (born 1928), American Pulitzer-winning novelist
 William Stetson Kennedy (1916–2011), American author and civil rights activist
 William Kennedy (poet) (1799–1871), Scottish poet, journalist, and diplomat
 William Kennedy (painter) (1859–1918), Scottish painter
 William Denholm Kennedy (1813–1865), Scottish historical, genre and landscape painter
 William Kennedy (drummer), drummer for Yellowjackets

Other
 William Kennedy (explorer) (1814–1890), Canadian sailor and searcher for John Franklin
 William Kennedy (Royal Navy officer) (1838–1916), British admiral
 William Clark-Kennedy (1879–1961), Canadian serviceman and recipient of the Victoria Cross
 William Quarrier Kennedy (1903–1979), British geologist
 William James Kennedy (active since 1990), British geologist
 William Kennedy Smith (born 1960), American physician and member of the Kennedy family
 William John Kennedy (1919–2005),  activist for the rights of Australian Aborigines
 William Parker Kennedy (1892–1968), president of the Brotherhood of Railroad Trainmen (BRT) from 1949 to 1962
 William Kennedy (Scottish footballer) (fl. 1890s)
 William Kennedy (footballer, born 1890) (1890–1915), English footballer
 William Kennedy (coach), Scottish footballer
 William Kennedy (athlete) (1898–?), Canadian Olympic athlete
 William Kennedy (cricketer) (1853-1889), New Zealand cricketer
 William Kennedy (rugby league, born 1969), Australian rugby league player
 William Kennedy (rugby league, born 1997), Australian rugby league player
 William Kennedy (priest) (died 1940), Anglican priest in Ireland
 W. P. M. Kennedy (William Paul McClure Kennedy, 1879–1963), Canadian historian and legal scholar

See also
 Bill Kennedy (disambiguation)
 Billy Kennedy (disambiguation)